Oscar Marin (born December 5, 1982) is an American professional baseball coach. He is the pitching coach for the Pittsburgh Pirates of Major League Baseball (MLB). He has also coached in MLB for the Texas Rangers.

Playing career
Marin graduated from Chatsworth High School in Chatsworth, California. Marin played for Los Angeles Valley College for two seasons (2001–2002). He then pitched for two seasons (2003–2004) at the University of Arkansas-Little Rock.

Coaching career

Amateur/Minor leagues
Marin started his coaching career in 2005 as an assistant coach for the University of Arkansas-Little Rock baseball team. In 2006 and 2007, he was the pitching coach at Los Angeles Valley College. Marin spent 2008 and 2009 as the pitching coach at Harvard-Westlake High School in North Hollywood, California.

Marin began his career in professional baseball when he joined the Texas Rangers organization, in 2010, as the pitching coach of the Arizona Rangers of the Rookie-level Arizona League. He remained in that role from 2010 to 2012. He was the pitching coach for the Leones de Ponce of the Puerto Rican Winter League during the 2012 offseason. In 2013, Marin was the pitching coach of the Spokane Indians of the Class A Short Season Northwest League. From 2014 to 2015, he served as pitching coach of the Hickory Crawdads of the Class A South Atlantic League. In 2016, Marin was the pitching coach of the High Desert Mavericks of the Class A-Advanced California League.

Marin left the Rangers organization and was the minor league pitching coordinator for the Seattle Mariners in 2017 and 2018.

Texas Rangers
Marin rejoined the Texas Rangers organization, for the first time on a major league staff, serving as their bullpen coach for the 2019 season.

Pittsburgh Pirates
On December 17, 2019, Marin was hired by the Pittsburgh Pirates as their pitching coach.

Awards 
Marin was named the South Atlantic League Coach of the Year for the 2015 season.

References

External links

1982 births
Living people
Baseball coaches from California
Baseball pitchers
Baseball players from Los Angeles
Little Rock Trojans baseball coaches
Little Rock Trojans baseball players
Los Angeles Valley Monarchs baseball coaches
Los Angeles Valley Monarchs baseball players
Major League Baseball bullpen coaches
Major League Baseball pitching coaches
Pittsburgh Pirates coaches
Texas Rangers coaches